United Nations Security Council resolution 1431, adopted unanimously on 14 August 2002, after recalling resolutions 827 (1993), 955 (1994), 1165 (1998), 1166 (1998), 1329 (2000) and 1411 (2002), the council established a pool of temporary judges at the International Criminal Tribunal for Rwanda (ICTR) in order for it to complete its work as soon as possible.

The security council was determined to monitor the progress of the ICTR as closely as possible and was convinced of the need to establish a pool of ad litem judges in order to facilitate the conclusion of its work. Under Chapter VII of the United Nations Charter, a pool of temporary judges was created and amendments were made to the statutes of the ICTR and the International Criminal Tribunal for the former Yugoslavia (ICTY) accordingly.

The secretary-general Kofi Annan was requested to make arrangements for the election of 18 temporary judges and provision of resources to the tribunal. Finally, all countries were urged to co-operate with the ICTR in accordance with obligations under Resolution 955; this was partly in reference to Rwanda which had been accused of adopting an uncooperative attitude towards the ICTR by the latter's president in their letters to the council.

See also
 List of United Nations Security Council Resolutions 1401 to 1500 (2002–2003)
 Rwandan genocide

References

External links
 
Text of the Resolution at undocs.org

 1431
2002 in Rwanda
 1431
August 2002 events